Bradystichus is a genus of New Caledonian nursery web spiders that was first described by Eugène Louis Simon in 1884.

Species
 it contains five species, found only on New Caledonia:
Bradystichus aoupinie Platnick & Forster, 1993 – New Caledonia
Bradystichus calligaster Simon, 1884 (type) – New Caledonia
Bradystichus crispatus Simon, 1884 – New Caledonia
Bradystichus panie Platnick & Forster, 1993 – New Caledonia
Bradystichus tandji Platnick & Forster, 1993 – New Caledonia

See also
 List of Pisauridae species

References

Araneomorphae genera
Pisauridae
Spiders of Oceania